The Kaliakoir Adarsha High School is a school located in Kaliakoir, Ullapara, Bangladesh. KAHS (as it is popularly known) was established in 1967
with the acronym KAHS; it is a public educational institution located at the Kaliakoir.

History and influence 

The school was established in 1967 and follows the traditional Secondary School Certificate (SSC) curriculum with the medium of teaching being Bengali.
Many of the graduates from the school become leaders and notable personnel of the country. It is one of one of the most prestigious schools in the District, despite having logistical problems. Most graduates from here do well in other areas of life.

Structure

The school enrolls students from class (grade) 6 to 10. There are three sections from class 6-class 10. Each section having 60 students. Every year about 300+ students appear in the SSC and JSC examination, with about three-fourths in science, and the rest in arts.

SSC results of last few years

Uniform

From the classes 6 to 10 the uniform is a white shirt with full-length navy blue pants and white shoes. For all years the school's monogram is printed on the shirt pocket.

Daily assembly

In order to create disciplined mind and obedience, assembly is called every day before schooling. Students telawaat Sura Fatiha, oath and sing national song of Bangladesh. Thus patriotism and moralities are grown in students' minds.

Exam system

There are two terms in a year. First one is Mid Term another one is Final Term.

Digital result

Students get their results printed from computer and the final result is announced taking 50% numbers from Mid Term and 50% number from Final Term.

Teachers-guardians conference

To make each students best from better, a conference is called where they discuss the problems of a student and how to remove those. Thus this school makes a good results in SSC and JSC .

Library

Library is called the builder of a nation. The library has ancient and modern books which are not easily found everywhere. Most of them were bought by coeval sanctioned money during the establishment of the school. Others were bought by annually approved money.

Students' association

The former students of KAHS  are known as KExSA (sometimes referred to Sboys), a phrase which was initially proposed by Sboys' Ex-Students Association (KExSA) just before its wider acceptance. KExSA, however, is the alumni association of the institution.

Extracurricular sports

The students of KHHS are active in sports. The annual sports competition is organized by the school authority in February each year. Sprints (100 to 400 meters), long jump, and high jump are few to mention among different kinds of sports in which students participate.

Notable alumni 

Many of the graduates from the school become leaders and notable personnel of the country. Notable alumni Aminul Islam, Nahid Hassan, Samiul Islam, Shafiqul Islam, Asaduzzaman Nur, Akramul Islam, juel Rana, and many other notable alumni upholding the KAHSSA legacy.

References

Educational institutions established in 1965
High schools in Bangladesh
1965 establishments in East Pakistan